Winton Woods is a park in Springfield Township and the village of Greenhills in the northern suburbs of Cincinnati, Ohio, United States. Winton Woods, the headquarters of the Great Parks of Hamilton County, was the second park founded in the district.

The park has reservable picnic areas and shelters with Great Parks Catering available. Winton Woods also offers an 18-hole disc golf course, 2.6-miles of paved trails, a 1.1-mile Parcours fitness trail, 0.7-mile Great Oaks and 1.1-mile Kingfisher nature trails, basketball courts and an equestrian trail. Possum Run Youth Camp is reservable. The park also offers full hookup and primitive campsites which holds an annualcampout during the Halloween season. Also, Winton Woods has a lake, known as Winton Lake, which has a harbor, boathouse, visitor center, and you can paddleboat and canoe in the lake as well.

Website

Parks in Hamilton County, Ohio